Louis Vitale, OFM, is a Franciscan friar, peace activist, and a co-founder of Nevada Desert Experience.   His religious beliefs led him to participate in civil disobedience actions at peace demonstrations and acts of religious witness over forty years. In the name of peace, Vitale has been arrested more than 400 times. Vitale stated that Francis of Assisi, Mahatma Gandhi and Martin Luther King Jr. provide him with inspiration.

Early life and education 
Louis Vitale was born on June 1, 1932, in San Gabriel, California. After graduating in 1954 from Loyola University, now Loyola Marymount University, Vitale enlisted in the US Air Force. Vitale's main role in the Air Force was that of an intercept officer, in charge of radio communications. Vitale took his vows as a Franciscan friar in 1960 when he was 28 years old. He was awarded a PhD for original research in sociology, September 1972, from University of California, Los Angeles.  From 1979 to 1988, Vitale served as the provincial superior of the Franciscan Friars of the Province of St. Barbara. He served as the pastor at St. Boniface Catholic Church for twelve years in the Tenderloin of San Francisco, California.

Pace e Bene 
Louis Vitale was one of the founders of Pace e Bene, a nonviolence service, in 1989. The name means Peace and all good. Other founders included: Sr. Rosemary Lynch, Alain Richard, Peter Ediger and Julia Occhiogrosso, who were all experienced peace activists. Pace e bene developed educational programs for nonviolent living with an emphasis on spirituality.  In 2005 Pace e Bene published a book Engage, which described Pace e Bene's programs.  The programs, as described in the book, were designed to encourage: the discovery, internalization and use of the power of nonviolence for personal and social change. Hundreds of nonviolence study groups were organized by Pace e Bene between 1989 and 2010.

Nevada Desert Experience 
In 1981 Vitale received a letter from Rome asking Franciscans to do something creative in 1982 to honor the 800th anniversary of the birth of St. Francis. Vitale took this to heart. The  First Nevada Lenten Experience was held at the Nevada test site, a series of witness and protest actions held at the atomic bomb test site near Las Vegas, Nevada. This was the precursor to the Nevada Desert Experience. Louis Vitale with Anne Bucher, Michael Affleck, Duncan MacMurdy, and two Franciscan friars, Ed Dunn and Terry Symens, founded the Nevada Desert Experience in 1984.  Over the years Corbin Harvey and the Shundahai Network worked with NDE holding many protests of the government's continued nuclear weapons work.  NDE worked with Corbin Harvey in protests against establishing a repository for radioactive waste at Yucca Mountain, 100 mi (160 km) from Las Vegas.

Arrests and protests 
 2006 Vitale was arrested at Fort Huachuca in Arizona with Jesuit Fr. Steve Kelly. They were protesting at the military compound responsible for training the US military in interrogation methods.  The protest was against the US policy of using torture at Abu Gharib and the Guantanamo Bay Detention Camp.  Ft Huachuca  Vitale was arrested on November 19, 2006 protesting against military intelligence training and US policy of endorsing torture at Abu Gharib and Guantanomo In 2007 Vitale was arrested at Vandenberg Air Force Base protesting Intercontinental Ballistic Missile (ICBM)Testing. Vitale was arrested at the Nevada Test site along with actor Martin Sheen and many others.
2007 Vandenberg Air Force Base, arrest.
2009  Vitale with John Dear, Eve Tetaz  arrested at Creech Air Force Base on April 9 protesting UAV Drone attacks in Pakistan.
 In November 2009, Vitale crossed the line at Ft Benning to protest the Western Hemisphere Institute for Security Cooperation. He served six months in a federal prison as a result.
 August 2009, Megan Rice and Louis Vitale were arrested at Vandenberg Air Force Base protesting a test of a Minuteman III Intercontinental Ballistic missile (ICBM) launched approximately 4,000 miles to the Kwajalein Atoll in the Marshall Islands.
 December 2009, Vitale joined  Gaza Freedom March on December 31, but after being stopped by the Egyptian government from making the trek, Vitale  joined 22 others in a fast and protest
 2010 November Vitale crossed the line (deliberately trespassing)  at Ft Benning to protest the U.S. Army's Western Hemisphere Institute for Security Cooperation. He served six months at Federal Correctional Institution Lompoc for that action.
January 27, 2011, Rice, with Kathy Kelly, John Dear, and Louis Vitale were convicted of trespassing as the result of a protest against weaponized drones at Creech Air Force Base.
 2012 August Drone convention in Las Vegas; Vitale registered and paid to attend and was threatened with arrest.

Awards and recognition 

 1999  Doctor of humane letters honorary degree: Quincy University in Illinois
2001  Pope Paul VI Teacher of Peace award given by PAX Christi USA
2003  Human Rights Award from Global Exchange
2003 The Voice of Peace Award awarded by School of the Americas Watch (March 9)
2004  Dignity: Pax e Bonum Award: given by St.Boniface Church  San Francisco (March 23)
2004 Peter J Sammon Award: given by Interfaith Coalition for Immigrant Rights.(October 14)
2006 Jefferson Award for Community Service from KTVU Channel 5 San Francisco
 2019 Lifetime Achievement Award To Pace e Bene Co-Founder Louie Vitale

See also 
 List of peace activists

Books 
Wittner, Lawrence S, Confronting the Bomb 2009 Stanford University Press

External links 

 http://nevadadesertexperience.org/about-nde/

References

External links
 Bio on Torture on Trial.org
 Bio on Pace e Bene

1932 births
Living people
American Friars Minor
American Roman Catholic priests
American anti-war activists
University of California, Los Angeles alumni
Loyola Marymount University alumni
Catholic Worker Movement
Peace movements
Religious activism
Anti–nuclear weapons movement
Christian anarchists
Civil disobedience